This is a list of German television related events from 2001.

Events
2 March - Michelle is selected to represent Germany at the 2001 Eurovision Song Contest with her song "Wer Liebe lebt". She is selected to be the forty-sixth German Eurovision entry during Countdown Grand Prix held at the Preussag Arena in Hanover.
12 May - Karina Schreiber wins season 3 of Big Brother Germany.

Debuts

Domestic
24 May - Vera Brühne (2001) (Sat.1)
5 December - Die Manns – Ein Jahrhundertroman (2001) (ARD)

International
16 April -  Tweenies (1999–2002) (KiKA)
17 April - / Sonic Underground (1999) (Super RTL)
17 December - // Redwall (1999–2002)

BFBS
9 February -  S Club 7 Go Wild! (2000)
 Bill and Ben (1952-1953, 2001–2002)

Television shows

1950s
Tagesschau (1952–present)

1960s
 heute (1963-present)

1970s
 heute-journal (1978-present)
 Tagesthemen (1978-present)

1980s
Wetten, dass..? (1981-2014)
Lindenstraße (1985–present)

1990s
Gute Zeiten, schlechte Zeiten (1992–present)
Marienhof (1992–2011)
Unter uns (1994-present)
Verbotene Liebe (1995-2015)
Schloss Einstein (1998–present)
In aller Freundschaft (1998–present)
Wer wird Millionär? (1999-present)

2000s
Big Brother Germany (2000-2011, 2015–present)

Ending this year

Births

Deaths

See also 
2001 in Germany